Hwa Chong International School (HCIS), a co-educational international school in Singapore that offers high school education. It is an affiliated school of Hwa Chong Institution catering to both local and international students.

Overview

Founded in 2005, Hwa Chong International School (HCIS) is part of the Hwa Chong family of schools. As a local international school, half of the students are Singaporeans or Permanent Residents, a requirement of the Ministry of Education (Singapore). The rest of the student body comprises international students from over 20 countries.

Activities

In November 2007, Hwa Chong International School hosted an International Youth Forum on Global Warming, attended by students from several countries.

In 2009, a group of Pre-University 2 students participated in the HPC Quest, an educational outreach program by A*STAR'S (Agency for Science, Technology and Research) Institute of High Performance Computing. The team brainstormed on the topic 'Digging for Cavities', working closely along with their teacher and a researcher from IHPC. HCIS was announced as the challenge champions.

HCIS was one of the three IB schools in Singapore chosen to host the International Baccalaureate Asia Pacific Regional Workshop in March 2009.

In June 2010, 15 students represented HCIS in the 20th Model United Nations (SMUN) hosted by the National University of Singapore (NUS). Among the 20 schools, both local and foreign, which participated in SMUN, HCIS was given the SMUN Best Delegation award, an achievement earned by the top three schools based on their team performance in the writing of position papers and their actual performance during the SMUN, which involves debates and redrafting of resolutions.

HCIS screened the 2010 World Cup finals in the school's multi-purpose hall.

HCIS also organizes a yearly talent competition called the Innofest where students in HCIS get an opportunity to showcase their talents.

In August 2013, HCIS organized an International Business Challenge where it brought together students from all over the world to compete in the field of business (e.g. marketing and knowledge in regards to brands and their meaning).

University Acceptance 
In addition to local universities, HCIS graduates have also gained admission into universities around the world –China, Hong Kong, Korea, Australia, Canada, New Zealand, the United Kingdom and the United States of America.

Admission
International students who wish to enrol in the school have to take an entrance exam which involves three papers, English, Mathematics and Science, and this is preceded by an interview with a senior teacher. Students enrolling using their PSLE results will need only to take an interview with a teacher (case by case basis).

Ethos, uniform and discipline
 
All subjects are taught in English, except for Chinese. All interactions with teachers must be in English. The school claims to provide a holistic education by means of "rigorous academic lessons, structured co-curricular activities and customised school programmes".
 
The school uniform is a casual jacket with the HCIS logo, a Polo T-shirt, with visible white ankle socks. Girls wear either khaki skirt or Bermudas. Boys up to and including Secondary 3 (Years 7, 8 and 9) wear khaki shorts. Only in Secondary 4 (Year 10) and above may they wear long trousers.
 
The school states that it employs "a full range of consequences, both positive and negative", to guide student behaviour. Good work is rewarded with commendations, award of certificates of merit and achievement, early promotion to a higher grade, positive reports from teachers to parents, and selection for overseas visits.
 
For behaviour there is a merit and demerit point system. Poor conduct may result in a student being placed on report, with daily feedback to parents and the Principal; denial of privileges such as free time during break periods; and "time out" periods. Demerit points require attendance at a weekly "formal reflection" session. Male students who persistently misbehave receive corporal punishment in the form of a caning. Students who accumulate 10 or more demerit points, and make no effort to improve, face strokes of the cane (boys) or suspension (girls). The same penalties are also applied in the case of serious offences such as vandalism, bullying or defiance.

External links

Hwa Chong International School school website

References 

International schools in Singapore
Bukit Timah
International Baccalaureate schools in Singapore
Educational institutions established in 2005
Hwa Chong Institution
2005 establishments in Singapore